Ardozyga frugalis is a species of moth in the family Gelechiidae. It was described by Edward Meyrick in 1904. It is found in Australia, where it has been recorded from New South Wales and Western Australia.

The forewings are fuscous, irrorated with dark fuscous, and finely sprinkled with whitish. The stigmata are very obscure, dark fuscous, with the plical obliquely beyond the first discal. The hindwings are grey or light grey.

References

Ardozyga
Moths described in 1904
Taxa named by Edward Meyrick
Moths of Australia